A court is a tribunal, often a governmental institution, with the authority to adjudicate legal disputes.

Court or courts may also refer to:

Institutions
Royal court, the retinue and larger household and entourage of a monarch, prince of the church, or a high nobleman

Places
Court, Saskatchewan, hamlet in Canada
Court, Switzerland, a municipality in the Canton of Berne
Court (Barry electoral ward), in the Vale of Glamorgan, Wales
Court (District Electoral Area), in Belfast, Northern Ireland
Court, any one of several places listed in the National Register of Historic Places listings in Pasadena, California
Courts Island, Tasmania
The Court, Charlton Mackrell, house in Somerset, England

People
Court (surname)

Architecture
 Courthouse, a building where justice is administrated; may house one or more courtrooms inside 
 Courtroom, an interior space (often inside a courthouse/court building) where legal proceedings are conducted 
 Courtyard or quadrangle (nicknamed "quad"), architectural features, with the latter term usually used at colleges or university campuses
 Food court, a collection of retail outlets selling food ready to eat
 Game court, a defined playing area with a prepared surface, for a game or sport, usually with solid boundaries, e.g.,
 Basketball court
 Volleyball court
 Squash court
 Tennis court

Arts, entertainment, and media
Court (film), a 2015 Indian courtroom drama film
Court Royal, an 1891 novel by Sabine Baring-Gould
The Court (TV series), a 2002 American legal drama television series
"The Court" (song), 2023 song by Peter Gabriel

Brands and enterprises
Court Line, a defunct frill-free charter airline
Courts (brand), a furniture retailer in the Caribbean and Pacific, and formerly the United Kingdom

Legal hierarchy
Supreme court
High court
District court
Juvenile court
Girl's court

Other uses
Court, a social group of animals, notably kangaroos
Court, a verb meaning to seek the affections of another, see courtship